Joseph Kpakpo Acquaye, is a Ghanaian physician and academic. He is a clinical haematologist, and a professor of Haematology at the University of Ghana Medical School. Acquaye served as the head of the Haematology department of the University  of Ghana Medical School from 1988 to 1990 and also 1994 to 2002, and was the president of the West African College of Physicians from 2003 to 2004. He also once served as the Director of the National Blood Transfusion Service.

Education 
Acquaye had his secondary education at the Accra Academy after which he proceeded to the University of London where he earned his MB, BS in 1966. He holds a Diploma in Pathology from the University of Liverpool and the Royal College of Pathology.

Career 
Acquaye is a clinical Haematologist and a professor of Haematology at the University of Ghana Medical School. Acquaye was first appointed head of the department of haematology in 1988, serving for two years. He combined his university role with being head of the National Blood Transfusion Service. In 1994, he was re-appointed head of the Haematology department of the University  of Ghana Medical School. He served in this capacity until 2002. A year later, he was made president of the West African College of Physicians.

Honours 
In 2016 he was a recipient of the Order of the Volta for his contribution to the socioeconomic development of Ghana. In 2018, the Conference room of the National Blood Service headquarters was named in his honour for his contribution to blood donation in Ghana.

References 

Living people
Ghanaian haematologists
Alumni of the Accra Academy
Alumni of the University of London
Alumni of the University of Liverpool
20th-century Ghanaian educators
Academic staff of the University of Ghana
Ga-Adangbe people
Year of birth missing (living people)